State Armory may refer to:

State Armory (Craig, Colorado), listed on the National Register of Historic Places in Moffat County, Colorado
State Armory (Springfield, Massachusetts), listed on the National Register of Historic Places in Hampden County, Massachusetts